Albert Michiels (born 14 March 1939) is a Belgian footballer. He played in four matches for the Belgium national football team from 1965 to 1966.

References

External links
 

1939 births
Living people
Belgian footballers
Belgium international footballers
Place of birth missing (living people)
Association football midfielders